One Chance is a 2013 British-American biographical film about opera singer and Britain's Got Talent winner Paul Potts, directed by David Frankel and written by Justin Zackham. It was screened in the Special Presentation section at the 2013 Toronto International Film Festival.

Cast

 James Corden as Paul Potts
 Alexandra Roach as Julz, Paul's wife
 Mackenzie Crook as Braddon, Paul's coworker at The Carphone Warehouse
 Valeria Bilello as Alessandra
 Colm Meaney as Roland, Paul's father
 Julie Walters as Yvonne, Paul's mother
 Trystan Gravelle as Matthew, Paul's lifelong bully
 Sion Tudor Owen as Choirmaster, Paul's mentor
 Jemima Rooper as Hydrangea, Braddon's girlfriend
 Alex Macqueen as Dr. Thorpe, Paul's emergency physician
The film also features archival footage of Simon Cowell, Amanda Holden, Piers Morgan, and Ant & Dec from Britain's Got Talent.

Production
Director David Frankel reduced his directing fee of US$6 million to US$1.2 million in exchange for a larger share of the film's gross. One Chance was shot in Italy and the United Kingdom.

Release
The film was shown at the Toronto International Film Festival on 9 September 2013 and released in cinemas on 25 October 2013.

Reception
On Metacritic, the film has a score of 49 out of 100 based on reviews from 12 critics, indicating "mixed or average reviews".

Soundtrack

The soundtrack was released in the United Kingdom on 21 October 2013. It was released in the United States the next day via digital download with two extra tracks by The London Session Orchestra, a CD was released on 7 January 2014. It was scored by Theodore Shapiro. "Sweeter Than Fiction" by Taylor Swift was included on the soundtrack and was released as the lead single on 21 October 2013 by Big Machine Records. The single received a nomination for Best Original Song at the 71st Golden Globe Awards.

References

External links

 
 
 
 

2013 comedy-drama films
2013 films
2013 comedy films
American comedy-drama films
Biographical films about singers
British biographical films
British comedy-drama films
Cultural depictions of classical musicians
Cultural depictions of British men
Cultural depictions of Luciano Pavarotti
2010s English-language films
English-language Welsh films
Films about classical music and musicians
Films about opera
Films directed by David Frankel
Films produced by Simon Cowell
Films set in the 2000s
Films set in Venice
Films set in Wales
Films shot in London
Films shot in Surrey
Films shot in Venice
Films shot in Wales
Films scored by Theodore Shapiro
The Weinstein Company films
Paul Potts
Albums produced by Taylor Swift
Albums produced by Jack Antonoff
2013 albums
2013 soundtrack albums
2010s American films
2010s British films